Hollywood Waste is an American independent record label and entertainment company located in Los Angeles, CA.

It was formed by Kyle Kore Parsons in 2012 under Century Media Records and distributed by Sony Music Entertainment. The label was home to Vampires Everywhere!, New Year's Day, Girl On Fire, Monsters Scare You!, Lions Lions, and It Boys!.

References

American record labels
Companies based in Los Angeles
Record labels established in 2012
Privately held companies based in California
2012 establishments in California